José María Minella (1909–1981) was an Argentine football player and manager. He played for and managed Argentina's national team.

Club career
A midfielder, Minella started playing at local club Independiente of Mar del Plata. On 23 August 1925, he was part of the local league team that achieved a 1–0 win over a team made of battleship HMS Repulse´s crewmembers during the Prince of Wales visit to Argentina. In 1928 he was signed by Gimnasia La Plata who won the amateur Argentine championship in 1929. He played in the team nicknamed El Expreso ("The Express") that nearly won the championship in 1933.

In 1935 he moved to River Plate where he was part of three championship's winning teams in 1936, 1937 and 1941.

Towards the end of his playing career he played in Uruguay with Peñarol and in Chile with Green Cross.

International career
Minella made his international debut in 1933, he played three times in the Copa América, in 1935, 1937 and 1941. Argentina won the 1937 and 1941 editions. He played a total of 24 games for his country netting one goal.

Managerial career
Minella took over as manager of River Plate in 1945, he led the team through one of the most successful eras in their history. Between 1952 and 1957 they won five championships in six years, including the club's second treble  in the professional era (1955, 1956 and 1957). He also won the Copa Aldao in 1947.

Minella had a spell as manager of the Argentina national team between 1964 and 1965, he returned as caretaker manager for one game in 1968. As national coach, he won the  Taça das Nações played in Brazil in 1964.

Legacy
In preparation for the 1978 FIFA World Cup a football stadium was built in Mar del Plata and named Estadio José María Minella after his death in 1981 to honour Mar del Plata's most significant football talent.

Honours

As a player

Club
Gimnasia La Plata
Argentine championship: 1929

River Plate
Primera División Argentina: 1936, 1937, 1941
Copa Aldao: 1937

International
Argentina
Copa América: 1937, 1941

As a manager

Club
River Plate
Primera División Argentina: 1945, 1947, 1952, 1953, 1955, 1956, 1957
Copa Aldao: 1947
Copa Ibarguren: 1952

Argentina
Taça das Nações: 1964

References

1909 births
1981 deaths
Sportspeople from Mar del Plata
Argentine people of Italian descent
Argentine footballers
Association football midfielders
Argentina international footballers
Club de Gimnasia y Esgrima La Plata footballers
Club Atlético River Plate footballers
Peñarol players
Club de Deportes Green Cross footballers
Chilean Primera División players
Argentine Primera División players
Argentine expatriate footballers
Expatriate footballers in Chile
Expatriate footballers in Uruguay
Argentine football managers
Argentina national football team managers
Club Atlético River Plate managers
América de Cali managers